Gordon Harold Revel (19 September 1927–unknown) was an English professional footballer who played in the Football League for Mansfield Town.

References

1927 births
English footballers
Association football defenders
English Football League players
Mansfield Town F.C. players
Possibly living people